Sigurd is a town in Sevier County, Utah, United States. The population was 429 at the 2010 census.

Geography
According to the United States Census Bureau, the town has a total area of 1.0 square mile (2.7 km2), all land.

Economy
USG has a mine and production facilities in Sigurd.

Demographics

As of the census of 2000, there were 430 people, 128 households, and 108 families residing in the town. The population density was 411.1 people per square mile (158.1/km2). There were 147 housing units at an average density of 140.5 per square mile (54.1/km2). The racial makeup of the town was 96.28% White, 1.40% Native American, 0.70% Asian, 0.23% from other races, and 1.40% from two or more races. Hispanic or Latino of any race were 2.33% of the population.

There were 128 households, out of which 46.9% had children under the age of 18 living with them, 69.5% were married couples living together, 9.4% had a female householder with no husband present, and 15.6% were non-families. 15.6% of all households were made up of individuals, and 11.7% had someone living alone who was 65 years of age or older. The average household size was 3.36 and the average family size was 3.69.

In the town, the population was spread out, with 36.0% under the age of 18, 10.0% from 18 to 24, 24.4% from 25 to 44, 17.4% from 45 to 64, and 12.1% who were 65 years of age or older. The median age was 28 years. For every 100 females, there were 108.7 males. For every 100 females age 18 and over, there were 105.2 males.

The median income for a household in the town was $32,813, and the median income for a family was $36,250. Males had a median income of $31,591 versus $17,500 for females. The per capita income for the town was $13,377. About 9.6% of families and 11.2% of the population were below the poverty line, including 16.9% of those under age 18 and none of those age 65 or over.

See also

 List of cities and towns in Utah

References

External links

Towns in Sevier County, Utah
Towns in Utah
Populated places established in 1874
1874 establishments in Utah Territory